Ram Chet Chaudhary is an Indian agricultural scientist.

Born and educated in India, he taught in various agricultural universities in India and went on to study in Germany.  His works on agriculture have been published across the world and form part of the curriculum in many Indian agriculture universities. He has studied the production of rice and other crops in Nigeria, the Philippines, Indonesia, Cambodia, Myanmar, as well as India. He has written a textbook on plant breeding, published by Oxford University Press in 1982 and reprinted 4 times through 1993, and a comprehensive work on rice varieties, published by FAO in 2001.

He founded on 8 September 1998, and is Chairman of the Participatory Rural Development Foundation (PRDF). Formerly he was the coordinator of the International Network for the Genetic Evaluation of Rice (INGER).

Awards 
In 1974 Ram Chet Chaudhary was given Dr. Rajendra Prasad (ex President of India) Award for developing excellent rice varieties for Uttar Pradesh, India.
In 2000 Ram Chet Chaudhary was awarded (along with other leading Rice scholars) the Distinguished Collaboration Award by the Cambodian Prime Minister Hun Sen.
In 2017 Ram Chet Chaudhary was awarded "Fellow of ISPGR" by Dr. M.S. Swaminathan, Dr. R.S. Paroda and other dignitaries. Dr. Ram Chet Chaudhary was also awarded by Indo - Nepal Samrasta organisation, in the presence of Prime Minister H. E. Mr. Oly, Deputy Prime Minister H. E. Mr. Yadav and others with "KARM RATNA Award" in 2018 in Kathmandu (Indo-Nepal Samrasta News 2018).

References

Year of birth missing (living people)
Living people
Indian agriculturalists